The American Journal of Critical Care is a bimonthly peer-reviewed nursing journal covering evidence-based Critical care nursing. It is published by HighWire Press on behalf of The American Association of Critical-Care Nurses of which it is an official journal. The journal was established in 1992, with C.W. Bryan-Brown and K. Dracup as its founding editors-in-chief. Its current editor-in-chief is Cindy L. Munro (University of Miami).

Abstracting and indexing 
The journal is abstracted and indexed in:
MEDLINE/PubMed
PsycINFO
CINAHL
Science Citation Index Expanded
Current Contents/Clinical Medicine
EBSCO databases
Scopus
According to the Journal Citation Reports, the journal has a 2017 impact factor of 2.055.

References

External links

Critical care nursing journals
Publications established in 1992
English-language journals